Leonid Ivanovich Popov (born August 31, 1945) is a former Soviet cosmonaut.

Biography
Popov was born in Oleksandriia, Kirovohrad Oblast, Ukrainian SSR.  He was selected as a cosmonaut on April 27, 1970, and flew as Commander on Soyuz 35, Soyuz 40 and Soyuz T-7, logging 200 days, 14 hours, and 45 minutes in space before his retirement on June 13, 1987. Popov is married and has two children.

He was awarded:
Twice Hero of the Soviet Union;
Three Orders of Lenin;
Medal "For Merit in Space Exploration" (Russian Federation);
Pilot-Cosmonaut of the USSR;
Honoured Master of Sport.
Foreign awards:
Hero of the Socialist Republic of Romania;
Hero of the Republic of Cuba
Hero of Socialist Labour (Vietnam);
Order of Ho Chi Minh (Vietnam) .

References

1945 births
Living people
People from Oleksandriia
Soviet cosmonauts
Heroes of the Soviet Union
Military Academy of the General Staff of the Armed Forces of the Soviet Union alumni
Soviet Air Force generals
Soviet major generals
Recipients of the Order of Ho Chi Minh
Salyut program cosmonauts